, is a chapel located within the Buddhist temple of  in the city of Iwaki, Fukushima Prefecture, Japan. The Amida-dō is a National Treasure and the temple, with its paradise garden, has been designated an National Historic Site.

History
The temple of Ganjō-ji was built in 1160 by Princess Tokuhime, daughter of Fujiwara no Kiyohira of the Hiraizumi Fujiwara clan, as a memorial temple for her husband, Iwaki Norimichi. The temple was granted imperial status by Emperor Go-Toba, and was protected and patronized by successive  of Iwakitaira Domain under the Tokugawa shogunate in the Edo period. The temple converted at some point from the Pure Land to the Shingon denomination and remains an active temple; however, the Pure Land Garden, including the pond, is now owned and managed by Iwaki City.

The temple was closed to the public due to the damage caused by the 2011 Tōhoku earthquake, but restoration was completed in July 2012 and the temple reopened.

Buildings
 Amida-dō (National Treasure); built in 1660. The building is a square structure with a thatched tented roof consisting of very thin layers of wood shingles. Inside, the walls were once covered with mural paintings, of which only a fragment remains. Along with Mōtsū-ji in Hiraizumi and a structure of Kōzō-ji in Kakuda, Miyagi, it is one of only three surviving structures of the Heian period in the Tōhoku region of Japan. The Amida-do is surrounded by ponds on all three sides: east, west, and south, and there is a worship path from the south.

Treasures
Inside the Amidadō are five statues:
 Wooden Amida Nyōrai triad (Heian period) (Important Cultural Properties)
 Wooden statue of Jikokuten (Heian period) (ICP)
 Wooden statue of Tamonten (Heian period) (ICP)

Gardens
Between 1972 and 1982 archaeological investigations were conducted into the pond, pebble beach, ornamental stones, peninsula, central island, and bridges of the twelfth-century paradise garden.

Gallery

See also
 Pure Land Buddhism
 List of National Treasures of Japan (temples)
 List of Historic Sites of Japan (Fukushima)
 Mōtsū-ji

References

Buildings and structures completed in 1160
12th-century Buddhist temples
Buddhist temples in Fukushima Prefecture
National Treasures of Japan
Important Cultural Properties of Japan
Historic Sites of Japan
Iwaki, Fukushima
Mutsu Province
Buddhist archaeological sites in Japan